Gaillot is a French surname. Notable people with the surname include:

Albane Gaillot (born 1971), French politician
Bernard Gaillot (1780–1847), French painter
Jacques Gaillot (born 1935), French Roman Catholic bishop and activist
Jean Baptiste Aimable Gaillot (1834–1921), French astronomer
Philippe Gaillot (born 1965), French footballer

French-language surnames